Supreme is a 2016 Indian Telugu-language action comedy film produced by Dil Raju under his banner Sri Venkateswara Creations and directed by Anil Ravipudi. It stars Sai Dharam Tej, Raashi Khanna  and music composed by Sai Karthik.

Production began on 23 September 2015 in Hyderabad and principal photography commenced on 5 October 2015. The film released on 5 May 2016. The film received mixed reviews from critics and audience, praising the cast performances (Sai Dharam Tej's and Mikhail Gandhi), humor, entertainment value and action sequences. The film grossed  and became highest grossing film in Sai Tej's career.

Plot 
Jagruthi Foundation was founded by a royal dynasty in Ananthapur, having thousands of acres of land, maintaining schools, colleges, hospitals, orphanages, old age homes, and many other social service activities, which was taken care by its trustee Narayana Rao. Vikram Sarkar, a mafia leader, wants to grab the entire foundation to build a factory, showing a loophole that it does not have original documents. Narayana Rao files a case in the court that he will produce the documents along with the original heir within a month. Narayana Rao and Sarkar both are in search of an original heir. Sarkar appoints a professional goon named Beeku to kill them. Narayana Rao learns that the original heir are in UK. Raja Rao, who is the third generation of the royal dynasty, has the documents. Raja Rao is ready to produce the documents to the people, but dies in a road accident and the documents are missing. 

Meanwhile, Balu is an aggressive taxi driver at Hyderabad who gets irritated if someone sounds the horn to his cab and makes their life miserable, he falls in love with an incompetent local SI Bellam Sridevi, Once Balu finds an Anglo-Indian orphan kid in his car trunk, He names him as Rajan and takes care of him along with his father. The three of them get emotionally attached and become a family. However, Rajan is suddenly kidnapped by Beeku and taken to Odisha. Balu and his father learn from Narayana Rao that Rajan is none other than Raja Rao's son and his parents are brutally killed by Sarkar. Balu's father accompanies Narayana Rao to help them with the case, while Balu sets out to bring Rajan back. 

Two musicians Seenayya and Shivayya also accompany him in name of providing a lift. Sridevi was kidnapped by Balu and through her, he receives the location. Rajan refuses to give the documents to Beeku, who calls psychiatrists for help. Balu, Sridevi, and the musicians dress up as psychiatrists and escape with Rajan. Sridevi soon starts liking Balu and reciprocates his feelings. After reaching Ananthapur, The four are caught by Beeku, but the handicapped man (whose daughter was saved by Balu and Rajan) protects them from the goons. Balu arrives and fights with them where he sends Rajan with Sridevi to the court. However, Sarkar blackmails Rajan that Balu will be killed, and Rajan, to save Balu lies in the court. Balu somehow reaches the court and Rajan provides the documents (which was hidden in his Iron Man toy) where he also reveals Sarkar's crimes in the court, where he is arrested. Sarkar attempts to shoot Balu and Rajan, but is shot dead by Sridevi. Sridevi is congratulated and receives the gold medal, which was her dream. The film ends with Balu and Sridevi's wedding.

Cast 

 Sai Dharam Tej as Balu, a taxi driver
 Raashi Khanna as Bellam Sridevi, a Sub-Inspector and Balu's love interest
 Mikhail Gandhi as Rajan, he was a little soldier and president of Andhra Pradesh, Telangana And Odisha,Balu's Friend
 Rajendra Prasad as Nagaraju, Balu's father
 Kabir Duhan Singh as Vikram Sarkar
 Ravi Kishan as Beeku, a professional goon appointed by Sarkar to kidnap Rajan
 Sai Kumar as Narayana Rao, The trustee of Jagruthi foundations
 Shiju as Raja Rao, Rajan's father
 Murali Mohan as Judge
 Posani Krishna Murali as Musician Shivayya, Seenayya's brother
 Ali as Doctor
 Vineet Kumar as Patnaik, Beeku's friend
 Tanikella Bharani as Commissioner of Police
 Vennela Kishore as Constable Kishore, Sridevi's assistant
 Jaya Prakash Reddy as MLA
 Raghu Babu as Sridevi's father
 Surekha Vani as Janaki, Sridevi's mother
 Sivannarayana as Sridevi's paternal uncle
 Srinivasa Reddy as Musician Seenayya, Shivayya's brother
 Fish Venkat as Police Officer
 Prudhviraj as Tom, Cruise's partner and a car thief
 Prabhas Sreenu as Cruise, Tom's partner and a car thief
 Satyam Rajesh as Rajesh, Balu's sidekick
 Sudigali Sudheer as Movie Director
 Shankar Melkote as Industrialist
 Raghu Karumanchi as MLA's henchman
 Gundu Sudarshan as Drunkard
 Gautam Raju as Hero
 Sapthagiri as a man in airport
 Ping Pong Surya as Sridevi's brother
 Meena Kumari as Sridevi's sister-in-law
 Rajitha as Sridevi's paternal aunt
 Sravan as Police Officer
 Raghava as Constable Raghava, Sridevi's assistant
 Giridhar as Venkatesh
 Thotapalli Madhu as M.P.
 Haribabu as Hari
 Shaking Seshu as Johnny ,Beeku's sidekick
 Comedian Mahesh as Spectacle Seller
 Shruti Sodhi as herself, special appearance in the song "Taxiwala"
 Anil Ravipudi (Special appearance)

Soundtrack 

The music was composed by Sai Karthik and Raj–Koti, with one song remixed from Yamudiki Mogudu. Music was released on Aditya Music Company. Audio was launched on 14 April 2015, held at Hyderabad.

Release
The film was also dubbed in Malayalam and Bhojpuri with same title and Hindi as Supreme Khiladi and Kannada as Superior.

References

External links 

2016 films
Films shot at Ramoji Film City
2010s Telugu-language films
2016 masala films
Indian action comedy films
Films scored by Sai Karthik
2016 action comedy films
Films directed by Anil Ravipudi
2016 comedy films
Sri Venkateswara Creations films